John Wardlaw Johnston (10 September 1921 – 21 January 1989) was a Scottish footballer, who played as a goalkeeper for Motherwell and Hamilton Academical.

References

1921 births
1989 deaths
People from Bo'ness
Scottish footballers
Association football goalkeepers
Armadale Thistle F.C. players
Rangers F.C. players
Motherwell F.C. players
Hamilton Academical F.C. players
Scottish Football League players
Scottish Junior Football Association players
Footballers from Falkirk (council area)